The Sierra Espuña is a mountain range in the Region of Murcia, Spain.  It is part of the Penibaetic System. The Sierra Espuña Regional Park protects 17,804 ha of the mountain range in the municipalities of Alhama de Murcia, Totana and Mula.  The highest peak, also known as Espuña, is at 1,583 metres.  The summit itself is a military area.  It houses the 13th Air Surveillance Squadron (EVA 13) radar station, part of the Spanish Air and Space Force.

By the end of the 19th century, the entire mountain range was in a poor ecological state, with the almost total loss of its tree cover and at risk of desertification. In 1889, the forest engineer Ricardo Codorníu undertook the enormous task of reforesting the entire mountain range. This reforestation task became a model for his time.

In 1931 the area was declared a natural site of national interest, and in 1992 it was protected as a Regional Park. It is also listed as a Special Protection Area for birds and a place of community importance (LIC).

Sites of interest

Ricardo Corníu Visitors and Management Centre 
The Ricardo Corníu Visitors and Management Centre takes its name from the forestry engineer who reforested the entire mountain range in the 19th century. It is an old mansion located in the heart of the Sierra. The centre has an information area, a Projection Room and an Exhibition Room.

Huerta Espuña
Next to the Visitor Centre is the area known as Huerta Espuña. It was the centre of operations for the restoration work directed by Ricardo Codorniú, where the first experimental crops were planted to study their viability in this environment. Currently you can see orchards that were used, some of them now in use for projects to recover protected wild flora.

Pozos de nieve 

In the high parts of the sierra are the Pozos de nieve ("snow wells"), ice houses first built at the end of the 16th century to store snow in winter and distribute it in summer in the form of ice to hospitals, cities and towns in the Kingdom of Murcia. These ice houses were in use until the 1920s.

Collado Bermejo viewpoint 

This viewpoint offers one of the best panoramic views of the entire Sierra, located at an altitude of 1,201 m.

Barrancos de Gebas

The Gebas barrancos (ravines) are to the east of the main sierra below the village of Gebas.  They are badlands like a lunar landscape, made up of gullies, canyons and ravines.

Fauna and flora 
Large parts of the Sierra Espuña are covered with pine trees.  Oleanders, poplars, elms, birches and willows are found in the riverbeds and ravines.

The diverse fauna of the Sierra includes around 120 species of birds, including eagles, jays, hawks, sparrowhawks, eagle owls and larks. Wild boar and squirrels can also be found here. The Barbary sheep was introduced to the Sierra Espuña in the 1970s.

Climate 
The climate of the Sierra Espuña differs from the rest of the Murcia region: there is around 200 millimeters more precipitation per year, and the temperature is around five degrees Celsius below the regional average.

References

External links 
Spanish Tourist Information: Sierra Espuña Regional Reserve
Murcia Tourist website: Sierra Espuña
Alhuma de Murcia Tourism:  Paths of Sierra Espuña

Espuna
Regional parks of Spain
Penibaetic System
Protected areas of the Region of Murcia